The flavodoxin fold is a common α/β protein fold, second only to the TIM barrel fold.  It has three layers, with two α-helical layers sandwiching a 5-stranded parallel β-sheet.  The order of strands within the sheet is 2-1-3-4-5.  

This motif is present for example in lactate dehydrogenase or phosphoglycerate kinase.

External links 
 SCOP list of proteins adopting the flavodoxin fold  (mirror)

References 

Protein folds